Leandro Sebastián Olivarez (born 15 May 1992) is an Argentine professional footballer who plays as a defender for Ferro Carril Oeste, on loan from Godoy Cruz.

Career
Olivarez began his Godoy Cruz career in 2011, appearing on the substitutes bench in a Copa Argentina tie with Sportivo Italiano on 24 November. He made his professional debut during the 2011–12 Argentine Primera División season, playing the full ninety minutes in a goalless draw against Independiente on 22 April 2012. Forty Primera División appearances later, Olivarez scored his first senior goal in the club's 2017–18 league opener versus Atlético Tucumán on 27 August 2017. 2018 saw Olivarez leave Godoy Cruz on loan to join Belgrano, which preceded a further loan move to Ferro Carril Oeste in January 2019.

Career statistics
.

References

External links

1992 births
Living people
Sportspeople from Mendoza, Argentina
Argentine footballers
Association football defenders
Argentine Primera División players
Godoy Cruz Antonio Tomba footballers
Club Atlético Belgrano footballers
Ferro Carril Oeste footballers